Riverside Junior/Senior High School may refer to:

Riverside Junior/Senior High School (Boardman, Oregon)
Riverside Junior/Senior High School (Taylor, Pennsylvania)

See also
 Riverside High School (disambiguation)